Mots D'Heures: Gousses, Rames: The D'Antin Manuscript (Mother Goose Rhymes), published in 1967 by Luis d'Antin van Rooten, is purportedly a collection of poems written in archaic French with learned glosses.  In fact, they are English-language nursery rhymes written homophonically as a nonsensical French text (with pseudo-scholarly explanatory footnotes); that is, as an English-to-French homophonic translation.  The result is not merely the English nursery rhyme but that nursery rhyme as it would sound if spoken in English by someone with a strong French accent. Even the manuscript's title, when spoken aloud, sounds like "Mother Goose Rhymes" with a strong French accent.

Here is van Rooten's version of Humpty Dumpty:

Sources
The original English nursery rhymes that correspond to the numbered poems in Mots d’Heures: Gousses, Rames are as follows:

 Humpty Dumpty
 Old King Cole
 Hey Diddle Diddle
 Old Mother Hubbard
 There Was a Little Man and He Had a Little Gun
 Hickory Dickory Dock
 Jack Sprat
 Peter Peter Pumpkin Eater
 There Was a Crooked Man
 Little Miss Muffet
 Jack and Jill
 There Was a Little Girl She Had a Little Curl
 Little Jack Horner
 Ride a Cockhorse to Banbury Cross
 Tinker Tailor Soldier Sailor
 Rain Rain Go Away
 Pat-a-cake Pat-a-cake Baker's Man
 Mistress Mary Quite Contrary
 Roses Are Red Violets Are Blue
 Tom Tom the Piper’s Son
 Mary Had a Little Lamb
 Cross Patch Draw the Latch
 See Saw Margery Daw
 The Queen of Hearts She Made Some Tarts
 One Two Buckle My Shoe
 There Was an Old Woman Who Lived in a Shoe
 Ladybird Ladybird Fly Away Home
 Monday’s Child
 Lucy Locket
 Curly Locks
 Here Is the Church Here Is the Steeple
 Simple Simon
 I Do Not Like Thee Doctor Fell
 Pussycat Pussycat
 Little Bo Peep
 Baa Baa Black Sheep
 Polly Put the Kettle On
 Lock the Dairy Door
 This Little Pig Went to Market
 Now I Lay Me Down to Sleep

Secondary use
Ten of the Mots d’Heures: Gousses, Rames have been set to music by Lawrence Whiffin.

Similar works 
An earlier example of homophonic translation (in this case French-to-English) is "Frayer Jerker" (Frère Jacques) in Anguish Languish (1956).

A later book in the English-to-French genre is N'Heures Souris Rames (Nursery Rhymes), published in 1980 by Ormonde de Kay. It contains some forty nursery rhymes, among which are Coucou doux de Ledoux (Cock-A-Doodle-Doo), Signe, garçon. Neuf Sikhs se pansent (Sing a Song of Sixpence) and Hâte, carrosse bonzes (Hot Cross Buns).

The dust jacket, layout and typography are very similar in style and appearance to the original Mots D'Heures albeit with a different selection of nursery rhymes.

Marcel Duchamp draws parallels between the method behind Mots d'Heures and certain works of Raymond Roussel.

Publication history 
 1967, USA, Viking Adult, hardcover, 40 pp.
 1967, UK, Grossman, 43 pp.
 1968, UK, Angus & Robertson, May 1968, hardcover, 80 pp.
 1977, UK, Angus & Robertson, De Luxe Ed edition, November 17, 1977, 40 pp.
 1980, US, Penguin, November 20, 1980, paperback, 80 pp.
 2009, UK, Blue Door, 29 October 2009, hardcover, 48 pp.

See also 
 N'Heures Souris Rames
Homophonic translation
Mondegreen
Phono-semantic matching

Notes

References

Homophonic translation
French nursery rhymes
1967 books
Books about cats
Pigs in literature

fr:N'Heures Souris Rames